Zagorka Počeković–Čupahin (Serbian Cyrillic: Загорка Почековић–Чупихан, born January 27, 1965) is a Yugoslav former female professional basketball player.

External links
Profile at sports-reference.com

1965 births
Living people
Basketball players from Belgrade
Serbian women's basketball players
Yugoslav women's basketball players
Centers (basketball)
Olympic basketball players of Yugoslavia
Basketball players at the 1984 Summer Olympics
ŽKK Voždovac players
ŽKK Crvena zvezda players